The OTI Festival 1975 was the fourth edition of the annual OTI Festival. It took place in San Juan, Puerto Rico, following the country's victory at the 1974 contest with the song "Hoy canto por cantar" by Nydia Caro. Organised by the Organización de Televisión Iberoamericana (OTI) and host broadcaster Telemundo, the contest was held at Telemundo television studios on Saturday 15 November 1975 and was hosted by Marisol Malaret and Eddie Miró.

The number of participating countries repeated the record of the previous year of 19 countries. The winner was Mexico with the song "La felicidad", performed by Gualberto Castro.

Background 
According to the original rules of the song contest, the winner country of the previous year would host and organise the edition of the following year. In this case, Puerto Rico, its participating broadcaster Telemundo and its entrant Nydia Caro were the winners of the previous year's show with the song "Hoy sólo canto por cantar". According to the same rules, the Caribbean island would turn into the host place of the festival in 1975. In fact, after a committee held between the top members of Telemundo, it was decided that San Juan, the capital city was the only suitable host city for the OTI Festival in Puerto Rico.

Venue 
The top members of Telemundo, the participating broadcasting in the event decided that the festival would not be held in a theatre or an exposition complex. It was decided instead that the event would take place in the TV studios of Telemundo in San Juan, which according to the members of the committee, were suitable and with good equipment. The seating capacity of the studios was considered also as suitable (1000 seats) although with a minor seat capacity than the previous venues of the festival.

The TV Studios of Telemundo in San Juan were built in 1954, the same year when that TV channel started broadcasting to the Puerto Rican audience. The channel, which had been created by the businessman Ángel Ramos, was in 1975 one of the main media companies in the island before expanding to the Spanish speaking communities of the United States of America.

Participating countries 
The number of participating countries repeated the last year's record of 19 countries. It must be taken into account the return of Argentina to the festival although other countries such as Portugal and its broadcaster RTP, whose return to the contest was expected, later ruled out sending a delegation to San Juan.

Other countries such as Honduras, which debuted the previous year, decided to withdraw from this edition due to the disappointment with their previous year's tenth place. The rest of the Central American countries which also had debuted back in 1974 with a different fate alongside countries such as Ecuador, United States and the Netherlands Antilles also confirmed their participation in this new edition of the event.

Participating performers 
One of the most prominent entrants in the fourth edition of the OTI Festival was the Spaniard singer-songwriter Evangelina Sobredo Galanes, better known in the artistic world as Cecilia. This singer, who was internally selected by RTVE would take part in the festival with the song "Amor de medianoche" (Midnight love), which was composed by Juan Carlos Calderón, who also composed that year's Spanish entry in the Eurovision Song Contest. Sadly her participation in the festival would turn into one of the singer's last appearances because less than a year later she died in a traffic accident.

The participation of the Chilean Osvaldo Díaz must be also taken into account. He was selected through a national final as the Chilean Broadcaster did the previous years. He would represent his country later in 1990.

The Mexican entrant was also selected in a national final, in this case, the "National OTI Contest", the successful and enormously popular selection process that Televisa used to produce every year. The participating song entitled "La felicidad" Composed by Felipe Gil and performed by Gualberto Castro won the National Final and got the ticket to San Juan.

Venezuela and their broadcaster Venevision also gave a significant fact to the event. The participating TV Channel again selected internally the well-known female singer Mirla Castellanos who had already represented her home country back in 1972 in Madrid.

Presenters 
Just like in the previous year, two presenters were the ones who hosted the event. This time the mistresses of ceremonies were the former Miss Universe 1970 Marisol Malaret and Beba Franco another former beauty contest participant.

There were two opening acts, One of them was the winning song of the previous year "Hoy sólo canto por cantar" by Nydia Caro.

As the previous presenters used to do, the presenters made a little introduction to the show by highlighting the main goals of the OTI as an organization and of the OTI Festival as a musical competition, which was to strengthen the musical cultural ties between the Spanish speaking and Portuguese speaking countries. The introductory speech, in which also was explained the voting process, was made both in Spanish and Portuguese languages.

After the introduction, both presenters introduced the performers and their countries short before they took the stage and after the performance round was over, they contacted telephonically the TV channels of the participating broadcasters to know the decision of the jurors.

Running order 
As happened in previous years, the host broadcaster, in this case Telemundo in collaboration with the Iberoamerican Television Organisation (OTI), organised a draw in San Juan few days before the event took place.

The performance round was opened by Bolivia and their entrant Óscar Roca with his song "Por esas cosas te amo" (For things such as those I love you) which did not receive a warm welcome.

The Spanish entrant and the favourite one for an important part of the audience entered the fifth to the stage.

The host country, in this case, Puerto Rico and their entrants, the New York City-based band Los Hispanos, were the eleventh ones to take the stage with their song "¿A donde vas amigo?" (Where are you going to... my friend?).

The performance round was ended by the entrant coming from Panama, the internally selected by TVN Pablo Azael with the song "Tu y yo" (You and me).

As happened the previous year in Acapulco, almost all the participating shows were performed in Spanish except the Brazilian entry which was sung in Portuguese.

Voting system 
The voting system followed the same dynamics of the previous years in which the juries were contacted telephonically by the presenters. The juries were composed again by five professional jurors who elected, each one, only their favourite song among the participating entries.

The national juries of every country were contacted directly by telephone by the presenters from the Telemundo Studios in San Juan in order to know the decision of the jurors.

Result 
This time there was an enormously clear victory from the Mexican entrant Gualberto Castro whose song "La felicidad" was warmly welcomed by the national juries of the participating broadcasters. In fact, the winning song won with six points of difference in comparison with the second classificate, the Spaniard Cecilia.

Gualberto Castro, who was already enjoying a celebrity status thanks to his victory in the Mexican national final, the "National OTI Contest" turned into one of the most popular and respected singers in Mexico. His participating song not only turned into a hit in Mexico but also in the rest of Latin America where he performed in various events and festivals.

The second Classificate Cecilia had already a successful career in Spain but her second place in the OTI Festival supposed for her leap to the Latin American audience in which she also enjoyed a moderate but growing popularity.

The third position of the Venezuelan performer Mirla Castellanos with a record of points awarded to her country lead to the consolidation of her career both in Venezuela and in Latin America. In fact, she even improved the fourth place that she got in the OTI Festival in Madrid back in 1972. She was in a tie with the neighbouring fellow Colombian performer Leonor Gonzalez Mina, who also got the third place with ten points.

The host contestants, the band Los Hispanos, got a respectable fifth position with five points.

This time two countries ended in the last place with zero points. Bolivia and El Salvador didn't manage to win the attention of the international jurors who didn't award points to their performers.

Audience and impact 

This time the viewing figures were slightly lower due to the technical issues that Telemundo had to face during the international airing of the OTI Festival outside Puerto Rico. Due to those issues, the OTI audience could not see the first part of the event. Anyway, the festival was seen by a large part of the Latin American audience and was considered by Telemundo a success not only for the broadcaster, but also for Puerto Rico as an international event host.

As was the case two years before with Imelda Miller, the Mexican audience saw with great interest the victory of their contestant Gualberto Castro and he was warmly received back to Mexico City.

References 

OTI Festival by year
Music festivals in Puerto Rico
1975 in Latin music